This is a list of video games developed, published and/or distributed by video game publisher Paradox Interactive.

Published games

Developed games

Cancelled and unreleased games
Several games announced by Paradox as being in development have since been put on hold indefinitely or cancelled.

See also

Paradox Development Studio
List of grand strategy video games
Wargame (video games)
Wargaming

Notes

References

External links
Official website

Paradox Interactive